Southern Pacific 2479 is one of six 4-6-2 heavy "Pacific" type steam locomotives built by Baldwin Locomotive Works in 1923 for the Southern Pacific Railroad (SP), designated the P-10 class. No. 2479 was retired from service in 1956. The locomotive is currently undergoing restoration to operating condition by the California Trolley and Railroad Corporation.

History

Design and initial use 
The six locomotives in 2479's class were designed to pull such trains as the Overland Limited between Sparks, Nevada, and Ogden, Utah, a total , without changing engines. Average speed was 35 mph including stops.

Performance proved most satisfactory and thereby set the basic design for all remaining Pacifics built for Southern Pacific Railroad (SP).  The Pacific held many long distance assignments including the Daylight Limited between San Francisco and Los Angeles, the Sunset Limited between Los Angeles and El Paso, Texas, and the Sparks to Ogden run.  As larger 4-8-2 class locomotives were assigned to these name trains, the 4-6-2 classes were reassigned to local passenger runs between Sacramento and Oakland and the San Francisco-San Jose, California, commuter service.  The 2479 ended its service on these routes.

In February 1937, disaster struck the 2479. Pulling a passenger train called "The Owl" and steaming at 70 mph as it approached Selma, California, the locomotive struck a car lodged on the tracks. The impact indirectly caused the locomotive, its tender and seven cars to derail. The engine's pilot was bent on impact with the automobile and caught at the next grade crossing throwing the locomotive off the rails. Both the engineer and the fireman were killed. Its retirement came on July 19, 1956, as steam locomotion technology was replaced with newer diesel locomotives. SP 2479 was donated and moved to the Santa Clara County Fairgrounds on September 6, 1958, where it became one of three surviving Southern Pacific 4-6-2 steam locomotives, the other two being SP Nos. 2472 and 2467.

Preservation and restoration 

Since 1989, the volunteers of the Santa Clara Valley Railroad Association (SCVRRA) have averaged over 5,000 hours per year on the restoration of SP 2479. This amounts to approximately twenty-five person years expended.  This time represents time spent directly on the locomotive and does not include the many hours spent attempting to raise funds, recruit and train volunteers, and do the administrative tasks that are required of any organization whether for profit or not.

At the end of 1994, the SCVRRA merged with the San Jose Trolley Corporation to form the California Trolley and Railroad Corporation (CTRC), a not-for-profit educational organization with the mission to preserve historic rail equipment of importance to the history of the Santa Clara Valley and to provide an interpretive venue. One of the underlying reasons for the merger was that the new organization could be a more effective fund raising vehicle.

To date, the principal source of funding for the locomotive restoration has been the Santa Clara County Historical Heritage Commission and volunteer fund raising efforts over the years. Approximately, $350,000 has been raised to date. Of this amount $230,000 represents the cost of the boiler repair done by a professional boiler contractor required by federal and state law.  The work on the boiler was begun by Manley Boiler Repair in May 1998. Work continues to progress as 2479's pistons are removed from its cylinders. At the end of October 2008 the CTRC passed a major milestone as 2479's front and rear trucks, the 6 main drivers where reinstalled below the locomotive and the locomotive was lowered to the ground for the first time in 15 years.

2479's former location was at the Santa Clara County Fairgrounds in San Jose, California. In 2021, CTRC and Pacific Locomotive Association announced the locomotive would be moved along with the San Jose roundhouse to the Niles Canyon Railway. On August 23rd, 2022, the locomotive’s boiler was separated from its frame and running gear. Those components were then loaded onto trucks for a short trip to Bonita, CA. The locomotive arrived at its destination the same day, and the boiler, frame, and running gear were reunited. Southern Pacific 1195, a preserved EMD SW900R diesel switcher, coupled to Southern Pacific 2479, and towed it to the Niles Canyon Railway’s Brightside Yard, in Brightside, CA.

See also 

 Southern Pacific 2353
 Southern Pacific 745
 Southern Pacific 786
 Santa Fe 1316

References

External links

2479
Baldwin locomotives
4-6-2 locomotives
Individual locomotives of the United States
Standard gauge locomotives of the United States
Railway locomotives introduced in 1923
Preserved steam locomotives of California